Dracophyllum verticillatum is a species of shrub or small tree endemic to New Caledonia. It was first described by Jacques Labillardière in 1800 and gets the specific epithet verticillatum for its flowers growing on verticillasters. In the heath family Ericaceae, it inhabits exposed plains and gentle mountain slopes and reaches a height of 0.2–7 m tall''.

References

Notes

Citations 

verticillatum

Taxa named by Jacques Labillardière
Plants described in 1800